Kathryn Lukas (Kate Lukas) is a contemporary flute performer and teacher. She is Professor of Music (Flute) at the Jacobs School of Music at Indiana University. She has taught at the Guildhall School of Music and recorded contemporary flute repertoire for the BBC.
As a member of the Ensemble Dreamtiger, which included cellist Rohan de Saram,
pianist (now Professor) Peter Hill, and pianist / composer Douglas Young, Kathryn Lukas recorded East-West Encounters for Cameo Classics. This CD is now distributed by Nimbus Records.
Lukas played flute on English punk band Wire's song "Strange", which featured on their 1977 album Pink Flag . She also played flute on "Heartbeat" from their 1978 album Chairs Missing.

References
British Library Sound Archives as Kathryn Lukas (33 items) and also Kate Lucas (2 items) both solo and with ensembles including Dreamtiger
Kathryn Lukas page on the Indiana University Site
Music workshop holds faculty concert Indiana Daily Student - Jul 16, 2008

American flautists
Jacobs School of Music faculty
Living people
Women flautists
Women music educators
Year of birth missing (living people)